The 2013 ITS Cup was a professional tennis tournament played on outdoor clay courts. It was the fifth edition of the tournament which was part of the 2013 ITF Women's Circuit, offering a total of $100,000 in prize money. It took place in Olomouc, Czech Republic, on 15–21 July 2013.

WTA entrants

Seeds 

 1 Rankings as of 8 July 2013

Other entrants 
The following players received wildcards into the singles main draw:
  Jesika Malečková
  Karolína Novotná
  Gabriela Pantůčková
  Barbora Štefková

The following players received entry from the qualifying draw:
  Tereza Malíková
  Pernilla Mendesová
  Petra Rohanová
  Zuzana Zálabská

Champions

Women's singles 

  Polona Hercog def.  Katarzyna Piter 6–0, 6–3

Women's doubles 

  Renata Voráčová /  Barbora Záhlavová-Strýcová def.  Martina Borecká /  Tereza Malíková 6–3, 6–4

External links 
 
 2013 ITS Cup at ITFtennis.com

2013 ITF Women's Circuit
ITS Cup
2013 in Czech tennis
2013 in Czech women's sport